Celmisia angustifolia, called the strap-leaved daisy, is a species of flowering plant in the genus Celmisia, native to the South Island of New Zealand. It has gained the Royal Horticultural Society's Award of Garden Merit.

References

angustifolia
Endemic flora of New Zealand
Flora of the South Island
Plants described in 1914